Mark Vanderloo (born 24 April 1968 in Waddinxveen) is a Dutch model and actor. As a model, he is known for his work with Hugo Boss. As an actor, he is the face of Commander Shepard in the Mass Effect trilogy. Vanderloo is regarded as a supermodel and achieved international success in the 1990s and 2000s.

Early life 
Mark moved from the Netherlands to Kenya at 3 years old and spent most of his childhood there with his family. At age 22, Vanderloo attended the University of Amsterdam to study history. In 1990 at the age of 22, Vanderloo first got acquainted with modeling when he accompanied a model girlfriend to a photoshoot. The photographer liked them both together and took photos for a milk advertisement, but he had an aversion for modeling and didn't pursue it.

Career 
In 1992, he earned extra money ($200) per night as a bartender and he signed a contract with the Wilhelmina Models agency. He did part-time modeling near his village in Holland. In 4 months he became an international model sensation. In 1994, he moved to New York, where he started working as Calvin Klein's Obsession model. A year later (1995) he was the face and body of Hugo Boss’ couture and ready-to-wear lines. Vanderloo was one of the first men to appear on the cover of the magazine Marie Claire in 1996. In the 1990s he reportedly did 50 fashion shows per week. In 1998, he appeared on The Tonight Show with Jay Leno (episode #6.176).

Vanderloo has been the primary model for Hugo Boss black-and-white print ads and billboards since 2005. He has also worked for Calvin Klein, Valentino, Armani, Gucci, Hermes, Banana Republic, Donna Karan, Trussardi and Guess. Vanderloo is signed to Wilhelmina Models in New York City. He has walked the runways at fashion capitals around the world. 

In 1995, his face was seen alongside Greg Louganis, Matthew Broderick, Tyson Beckford and Bridget Hall in a Time Warner- funded AIDS awareness campaign. In 1996 he was the Model of the Year for the music video channel VH1. In 1998, he participated in a garage sale event with dozens of celebrities for the Ovarian Cancer Research Fund which was presided by Liz Tilberis. Vanderloo is considered next to Marcus Schenkenberg, Werner Schreyer and Alex Lundqvist as one of the most famous male models.

In addition to his work in the fashion industry, Vanderloo's likeness was used as the default model for the male version of Commander Shepard in the Mass Effect video game series for Xbox 360, PC, PlayStation 3 and Wii U. Vanderloo made a guest appearance on Cycle 11 of America's Next Top Model in 2008. In September 2014, Vogue.com ranked Vanderloo at 8th place in 'Top 10 Male Models of All Time'.

Personal life
Mark Vanderloo speaks 5 languages and he has homes in New York, Paris, Amsterdam and Ibiza. His best friend is the Swedish model Alex Lundqvist.

He had a long relationship and was married to the Spanish model Esther Cañadas (12 June 1999 - November 2000), who also promoted DKNY, and was frequently the subject of gossip columns in American tabloids.

Vanderloo and Dutch actress (and former model) Robine van der Meer dated for 8 years and have two children: Emma Paula (born 6 February 2004) and Mark (born 4 November 2005). On June 3, 2011, Mark and Robine married on the uninhabited island of S'Espalmador, south of Ibiza. They were fined €2,000 ($2570) for not obtaining a wedding permit. In 2016 they moved to Amsterdam, because their daughter (12) wanted to attend high school in Holland. They maintain their real estate investments in Spain. They bought a €1 million Canal house on the Singel in Amsterdam. They have another home in Amsterdam-Zuid.

As of 2012, Vanderloo holds the position of number 4 under Top Icons Men on models.com. The Derek Zoolander character of the film Zoolander is loosely based on Vanderloo's and Johnny Zander's (fellow male model) names.

Filmography 
This is a selected filmography.

Film

Television

Video games

References

External links

1968 births
Living people
Dutch male models
Dutch male film actors
People from Waddinxveen
20th-century Dutch people